Prakashchandra Pandurang Shirodkar, (1941 – 6 May 2021), the eldest son of late Pandurang Purushottam Shirodkar, was an Indologist, archaeologist, writer. His father, Pandurang Shirodkar, was one of the most prominent freedom fighters of Goa, and also served as the first speaker of the Goa, Daman and Diu Legislative Assembly. Prakashchandra Shirodkar  worked as the director of Directorate of Archives, Archaeology and Museum of Goa for over two decades.  He was also the Executive Editor of the Goa Gazetteer Department for about 20 years.  Śiroḍakara had devoted his life to research, and has made valuable contributions in the field of Archeology and History of Goa. He has been the Founder Editor of Colloquium, a research journal of the Goa Institute for Historical and Cultural Research as well as Purābhileka-Purātatva, a research journal of the Directorate of Archives, Archaeology and Museum, Goa (1986–1999).

In 1993, Prakashchandra Pandurang Shirodkar discovered rock art engravings on lateritic platforms and granite boulders from Usgalimal on the banks of west-flowing river Kushavati, which has shed light on the prehistory of Goa and the existence of humans in Goa during the Paleolithic and Mesolithic..He died on 6 May 2021 due to ill health.

Literary work
Prakashchandra Pandurang Shirodkar has authored and edited several books and research articles.  His work includes:

See also
 Daivadnya Brahmin
 List of people from Goa

References

1941 births
2021 deaths
Place of birth missing
Goa politicians
20th-century Indian archaeologists
20th-century Indian historians
Scientists from Goa